The Africa-EU Summit, which was held on 8 December – 9 December 2007 in Lisbon, Portugal, was the second summit between heads of state and government from EU and Africa (the first having been held in Cairo in 2000). It was hosted by Portugal, the holder of the EU's rotating presidency. During the summit, the "Joint EU-Africa Strategy", the "Action Plan" and the "Lisbon Declaration" were adopted.

There was controversy about the attendance of Robert Mugabe, the President of Zimbabwe, as he is subject to an EU travel ban. The European Commission president, José Manuel Barroso, defended inviting Mugabe to attend, saying that "If international leaders decided not to go to those conferences involving countries which do not have reasonable human rights records, I'm afraid we would not be attending many conferences at all." Because of Mugabe's attendance, Prime Minister Gordon Brown of the UK stayed away, and United Kingdom was represented by Baroness Amos. Prime Minister Mirek Topolánek of the Czech Republic also stayed away for the same reason.

Issues and results of the summit 
The summit agreed on eight strategic partnerships and an action plan and agreed to meet again in 2010.

The eight areas for strategic partnerships are:

Peace and security
Democratic governance and human rights
Trade, regional integration and infrastructure
Millennium Development Goals
Energy
Climate change
Migration, mobility and employment
Science, information society and space.

The existing preferential trade agreements between the EU and the ACP countries would  not be compatible with WTO rules, except for a waiver which terminated at the end of 2007, and it had been hoped to replace these arrangements by WTO-compatible Economic Partnership Agreements (EPAs), but these were rejected by the African delegations.

Differences on human rights centered on Zimbabwe and its president, Robert Mugabe, as well as the Darfur conflict.

Countries at the summit

European Union

African Union

Observers

Parliaments 
European Parliament
Pan-African Parliament

EU candidate countries

Other countries

International organizations 

UNHCR
African Development Bank
UNAIDS
FAO
Arab League

See also 
Foreign relations of the African Union
Foreign relations of the European Union

References

External links 
Official summit Web site
 The Lisbon Declaration (pdf)
 The Africa-EU Strategic Partnership: Joint Africa-EU Strategy and Action Plan (pdf)
  EuropAfrica Towards Lisbon 2007

2007 in Portugal
EU summit 2007
EU summit 2007
European Union and third organisations
Diplomatic conferences in Portugal
21st-century diplomatic conferences
2007 in international relations
2007 conferences
2007 in the European Union
2000s in Lisbon
Events in Lisbon
December 2007 events in Europe
December 2007 events in Africa